Agata Pyzik (born c. 1983) is a Polish journalist and cultural critic who has written on politics, art, music, and culture. In 2014 she wrote a book - Poor But Sexy: Culture Clashes in Europe East and West examined the artistic and cultural history of late-20th century Eastern Europe under socialism and its eventual transition to neoliberal capitalism. Her writing has appeared in The Wire, The Guardian, New Statesman, frieze, and New Humanist. She lives in Warsaw.

Biography
Pyzik was born in the 1983 in Poland, where she pursued academic studies in philosophy, art history, English, and American studies.(lack of detailed information about university attended. Did she drop out, or graduated?) She wrote for Polish magazines such as Gazeta Wyborcza, Dziennik, and Polityka, as well as music magazine Glissando and smaller literary magazines. Her recent interests have turned toward political aesthetics and forms of resistance. Her study of Eastern Europe, Poor But Sexy, was published by Zero Books in 2014.

Discussion of Poor But Sexy (2014)
In a review of Poor But Sexy for The Guardian, Sukhdev Sandhu wrote that

Critic Simon Reynolds called the book

Bibliography
 Poor But Sexy: Culture Clashes in Europe East and West. (Zero Books, 2014)
 Dziewczyna i pistolet (Pamoja Press, 2020)''

References

Polish journalists
Polish women journalists
1983 births
Living people
21st-century Polish women writers